Lazo (né Lazarus J. Finn) is a reggae musician from Castle Bruce, Dominica. He immigrated to Canada in 1979 and holds a degree in Political Science from the University of Toronto.

Music career

Lazo began their music career at the age of 15 with a band called Black Blood, whose debut album charted #2 and received extensive airplay in the Caribbean. Soon after immigrating to Canada, Lazo formed his own band, Unity, releasing a recording in 1990. Upon relocating to Toronto, he created The Lazo Band, and released the well-received recording, Satisfaction Guaranteed. Lazo subsequently produced two solo CDs: Something Real, nominated for a Juno Award in 1995, and Impetus, for Washington D.C. based RAS records (Lazo was the first Canadian artist signed to that label).

Frequenting London, Ontario's Sunfest festival, Lazo earned the nickname, "Mr. Sunfest" is well deserved- Artistic Director "Alfredo Caxaj" recently touted..."Is it any wonder we’ve invited him back for a 15th year in a row?"

Lazo tours throughout the United States, Canada and the Caribbean. His list of international venues & festivals is ever growing, (i.e. Brazil's Carnaval de Salvador, El Salvador, Argentina)

In 2010, Lazo toured the United States and South America playing as a member of The Wailers. The South American leg of the tour included African Reggae Star, Alpha Blondie.

In addition to his solo career, Lazo fronts for Craig Martin's Classic Albums Live: Bob Marley – Legend performing at venues such as Hard Rock Cafe, House of Blues, and theaters across the US and Canada.

Awards
Lazo has been named the Top Reggae Performer of the Year by the Canadian Reggae Music Awards and in 2000 his release Heart and Soul won the Juno for Best Reggae Recording.

References

External links
 Lazo Music

Calypsonians
Dominica musicians
Juno Award for Reggae Recording of the Year winners
Canadian reggae musicians
Black Canadian musicians
Dominica emigrants to Canada